Streptomyces rosealbus is a bacterium species from the genus of Streptomyces which has been isolated from forest soil from Yongsheng from the Yunnan Province in China.

See also 
 List of Streptomyces species

References

Further reading

External links
Type strain of Streptomyces rosealbus at BacDive -  the Bacterial Diversity Metadatabase	

rosealbus
Bacteria described in 2012